Cherupuzha may refer to:

 Cherupuzha (Kannur), Town in the state of Kerala, India
 Cherupuzha (Karulai), Kerala, a river
 Cherupuzha (Mavoor), Kerala, a river
 Cherupuzha (Areekode), Kerala, a river